The 1951 U.S. Women's Open was the sixth U.S. Women's Open, held September 13–16 at Druid Hills Golf Club in Atlanta, Georgia.

First-year professional Betsy Rawls, age 23, won the first of her eight major championships, five strokes ahead of runner-up Louise Suggs, the 1949 champion. It was the first of four U.S. Women's Open titles for Rawls, with additional wins in 1953, 1957, and 1960.

Prior to this event, the LPGA Tour petitioned the United States Golf Association (USGA) to take over the championship, which it did two years later in 1953.

Past champions in the field

Final leaderboard
Sunday, September 16, 1951

Source:

References

External links
 USGA final leaderboard
 U.S. Women's Open Golf Championship
 U.S. Women's Open – past champions – 1951

U.S. Women's Open
Golf in Georgia (U.S. state)
Sports competitions in Atlanta
U.S. Women's Open
U.S. Women's Open
U.S. Women's Open
U.S. Women's Open
Women's sports in Georgia (U.S. state)
Women in Atlanta